Chris "Frenchie" Smith (born in Durant, Oklahoma) is an American record producer, guitarist and songwriter.

Biography 
Smith first began as a guitar player in the Austin, Texas noise-pop band Sixteen Deluxe in 1994. The band signed with Warner Bros. in 1996.
After Sixteen Deluxe disbanded in 2000, Smith formed Young Heart Attack in 2001 with Steven Hall and Joey Shuffield from Fastball. Young Heart Attack signed with XL Recordings in 2003 and released their debut album Mouthful of Love in 2004. The band did several high-profile tours with Motörhead, the Darkness, and Peaches.

Production took more of Smith's focus as time went on and he co-owns The Bubble Recording studio in Austin.

Smith has produced records for many notable acts including ...And You Will Know Us by the Trail of Dead, Meat Puppets, the Toadies, Gregg Rolie, the Answer, Built to Spill, Jet and Graveltooth.  In 2007, Smith was nominated for a Grammy for 'Best Zydeco or Cajun Album' for his work on the Lost Bayou Ramblers album Live: A La Blue Moon.

Smith was chosen to speak at the 2009 SXSW Producer Panel convention with other record producers.

Productions and mixing 

The following are notable artists Smith has produced for:
...And You Will Know Us by the Trail of Dead
The Answer
Gregg Rolie
The Darkness
The Silent Comedy
Helios Creed
Jet
The Dandies
The Datsuns
Lost Bayou Ramblers
Meat Puppets
Ringo Deathstarr
Scorpion Child
The Boxing Lesson
Young Heart Attack
Lions
Residual Kid
The Front Bottoms
Wild Child

References

External links
Worlds End Producer Management
Frenchie Smith Records
The Bubble - Recording & Mastering Studio - Austin, TX

Record producers from Oklahoma
People from Durant, Oklahoma
Living people
Year of birth missing (living people)
Place of birth missing (living people)